Asfour Crystal is an Egyptian crystal manufacturing company that produces crystal pieces under its own name. The company produces clear and coloured crystals for diverse uses including lighting, accessories, fashion pieces, chandeliers, figurines and special projects. At the present time, Asfour Crystal is the world’s largest manufacturer and exporter of crystal, having a production capacity that exceeds 100 tons of crystal per day and exporting to more than 50 countries across the globe.

History 
Asfour Crystal was established in 1961   in Cairo, Egypt and began with a 2,200 square meter workspace that employed 200 craftsmen and utilized simple, basic production tools. Nowadays, Asfour Crystal had expanded into 5 crystal factories that cover a total build-up area of more than 1.2 million square meters. The factories employ more than 28,000 craftsmen and women, and the company still stand at that status till today.

In 2000, Asfour Crystal launched the Crystal Fashion Components division, producing clear and coloured crystals for the fashion industry with all its sectors, including accessories, apparel, jewellery and decoration.

References 

1961 establishments in Egypt
Manufacturing companies established in 1961
Glassmaking companies of Egypt
Manufacturing companies based in Cairo
Egyptian brands